Theseus was the mythical king and founder-hero of Athens.

Theseus may also refer to:

Vehicles
Theseus (AUV), an autonomous underwater vehicle
THESEUS (satellite), a proposed space telescope
Bristol Theseus, an aircraft engine
HMS Theseus, three ships of the Royal Navy

Other uses
 Theseus (genus), a genus of stink bug in the tribe Halyini
 Theseus1 (THE1), an enzyme found in plant cells
 An electromechanical mouse constructed by Claude Shannon
"Theseus", a 2008 episode of the radio comedy The Penny Dreadfuls
"Theseus", a song by Patrick Wolf from The Bachelor

See also
Ship of Theseus, also known as Theseus's paradox
Ship of Theseus (film), a 2013 Indian film by Anand Gandhi
Theseus Ring, a gold signet ring that dates back to the Minoan period
Morpho theseus, a butterfly